The Mecklenburg Times is an American, English language daily newspaper headquartered in Charlotte, Mecklenburg County, North Carolina.  The newspaper was founded in 1923 and is a member of the North Carolina Press Association.

See also
 List of newspapers in North Carolina

References

Daily newspapers published in North Carolina
1923 establishments in North Carolina
Publications established in 1923
Mass media in Charlotte, North Carolina